Peel Street is located in Central, Hong Kong. It is named after Robert Peel, the two-time British prime minister.

History
The road was built in the 1840, at the start of the colonial era, and named for British prime minister Sir Robert Peel. Initially settled by Westerners, Chinese took over the area in the 1870s, and the expatriates had all but gravitated towards Conduit Road in the Mid-Levels by about the 1950s.

Wai Siu-pak, founder of Yee Tin Tong pharmacy, once lived in Wise Mansion, a large house at the top of Peel Street next to Robinson Road. The section of Peel Street between Hollywood Road and Staunton Street was known for its calligraphers specialised in making signboards in the 1950s and 1960s. The part below Hollywood Road was well known for its Indian curry restaurants. However, expensive rents have driven these trades out of the area, which is now populated by modern tower blocks. The century-old Graham Street market is situated at the lower reaches of Peel Street.

Features
Peel Street is a small street starting from the Queen's Road Central and reaches upwards into the Mid-Levels. At the lower end, there is a fresh food market. At the upper end, there are many eateries, both traditional and trendy. There was also the Ho Hei Kee Umbrella, run by Ho Hung-hei, which had attracted the attention of many mass media. Ho died in 2015 after closing his shop in 2014.

There is a shrine dedicated to Pak Kung in Peel Street, just below the junction with Staunton Street.

Redevelopment plan
Urban Renewal Authority declared Peel Street/Graham Street redevelopment project. As the project is located at the historical Central street market, it aroused much attention on the conservation of culture.

Gallery

See also
 List of streets and roads in Hong Kong

References

External links

 (in English) All Buildings on Peel Street with Pictures (2019), OneDay
 About Ho Hei Kee Umbrella, City Magazine

Central, Hong Kong
Ladder streets in Hong Kong
Street markets in Hong Kong
Roads on Hong Kong Island